3,5,7-Trioxododecanoyl-CoA synthase (TKS) is an enzyme with systematic name malonyl-CoA:hexanoyl-CoA malonyltransferase (3,5,7-trioxododecanoyl-CoA-forming). This enzyme catalyses the following chemical reaction

 3 malonyl-CoA + hexanoyl-CoA  3 CoA + 3,5,7-trioxododecanoyl-CoA + 3 CO2

This polyketide synthase catalyse the first step in the cannabinoids biosynthetic pathway of the plant Cannabis sativa.

References

External links 
 

EC 2.3.1